The Van Duzen River is a river on the north coast of California. It is a major tributary of the Eel River and drains , mostly in Humboldt County, with a small portion in Trinity County. The river has two forks in its upper reaches. The North Fork travels northwest until it reaches the small town of Dinsmore, where it starts flowing west. The Little Van Duzen, which also flows northwest, joins the North Fork a few miles later. The river flows roughly west from then on. It meets its largest tributary, Yaeger Creek, about  before it reaches the Eel River.

The river is used for recreation at locations including Grizzly Creek Redwoods State Park and for industrial, agricultural and municipal water supply by residents living along the western portion of California State Route 36. The river also provides wildlife habitat for preservation of rare and endangered species including cold freshwater habitat for fish migration and spawning. The primary land use in the watershed is timberland. Road construction and poor logging practices, particularly historical, have increased erosion, leading to excessive sediment buildup in the river and its tributaries. In addition, gravel mining, particularly at the confluence of the Van Duzen and Eel River, has increased erosion, affected channel alignment and may block fish migration.

About 26 percent of the land is owned by industrial timber companies. About 31 percent is privately owned, but not industrial, land used for timber production and ranches. Residential land makes up 26 percent and public land makes up 17 percent. Most of the public land is near the river's headwaters in Six Rivers National Forest.

The Van Duzen River has been federally designated as a "National Wild and Scenic River".  It is named for  James Van Duzen a member of the Josiah Gregg exploring party that first traveled to Humboldt Bay overland in 1849.

References

United States Environmental Protection Agency
Klamath Resource Information System

External links
, USGS, GNIS
 Friends of the Van Duzen River

Rivers of Humboldt County, California
Rivers of Trinity County, California
Six Rivers National Forest
Rivers of Northern California
Tributaries of the Eel River (California)
Wild and Scenic Rivers of the United States